The Colegiata de Santa María la Mayor (Spanish: Colegiata de Santa María la Mayor) is a collegiate church located in Caspe, Spain. It was declared Bien de Interés Cultural in 1908.

See also 
 List of Bien de Interés Cultural in the Province of Zaragoza

References 

Bien de Interés Cultural landmarks in the Province of Zaragoza
Churches in Aragon